Rivy Poupko Kletenik is an American lecturer and educator.

Career 
Poupko Kletenik is Head of School at the Seattle Hebrew Academy and wrote a monthly Jewish advice column called JQ for Seattle's The Jewish Sound. She was the recipient of a Covenant Foundation Award for Jewish educators in 2002.

Personal life 
Born and raised in Pittsburgh, Pennsylvania, Poupko Kletenik is the daughter of Gilda Twerski Novoseller Poupko, descendant of a Hasidic dynasty, and Baruch Poupko, rabbi for over 60 years of Shaare Torah Congregation in Pittsburgh.

She is married to Rabbi Moshe Kletenik, and they have four children, including Isaiah Kletenik and Gilah Kletenik.

References

External links 
On Jewish Education for Women

University of Washington Digital Archives Interview with Rivy Poupko Kletenik 2017

Washington's First Foray into Outdoor Learning with Rivy Poupko Kletenik 2020

Jewish education in the United States
Rebbetzins
Jewish American academics
Jewish American writers
Religious leaders from Pittsburgh
Living people
American women academics
American religion academics
Jewish women writers
Year of birth missing (living people)
21st-century American Jews
21st-century American women